{{DISPLAYTITLE:C12H20O4}}
The molecular formula C12H20O4 (molar mass: 228.28 g/mol, exact mass: 228.1362 u) may refer to:

 Maleic acid dibutyl ester
 Octenylsuccinic acid
 Traumatic acid